DAC Beachcroft LLP is an international law firm headquartered in London, United Kingdom. In the UK, Europe, Asia-Pacific, Latin America, and North America, it employs about 2,500 lawyers and other professionals. It offers full-service capabilities for claims, business, risk, advisory, and transactions, primarily in the areas of health, insurance, and real estate.

History

 1762 Origins of the firm – Joseph Eyre began practising at Christ's Hospital
 1828 Richard Beachcroft founded a London practice, which later became Beachcrofts
 1830 Wasbrough & Stanley was formed, which later became Stanley Simpson
 1882 Wansbroughs opened in Bristol, which became Wansbroughs Willey Hargrave (WWH)
 1927 Davies Arnold Cooper (DAC) was formed in London
 1988 Beachcroft Stanleys was formed by the merger of Beachcroft and Stanley Simpson
 1999 Beachcroft Wansbrough was formed by the merger of WWH and Beachcroft Stanleys
 2006 Beachcroft LLP was incorporated on 1 May
 2008 Davies Arnold Cooper acquired KSB Law LLP in London
 2009 Beachcroft acquired Kings Legal in Newport, South Wales
 2010 Beachcroft acquired the business of Williams Holden Cooklin Gibbons (WHCG)
 2011 Beachcroft merged with Davies Arnold Cooper to form DAC Beachcroft
 2012 DAC Beachcroft merged with the Scottish law firm Andersons Solicitors LLP, with its operations subsequently being rebranded as DAC Beachcroft Scotland
 2012 DAC Beachcroft merged with Santiago-based law firms SegurosLex and Amunategui y Cía to form DAC Beachcroft Chile
 2013 DAC Beachcroft merged with Bogotá-based law firm De La Torre & Monroy to form DAC Beachcroft Colombia
 2015 DAC Beachcroft formed association with Demarest Advogados in Brazil
 2015 DAC Beachcroft opened office in Miami, US
 2016 DAC Beachcroft formed association with McKinty & Wright
 2016 DAC Beachcroft formed association with BLP (Central America) and TCPR (Peru)
 2017 DAC Beachcroft was a founding member of Legalign Global, covering UK, USA, Germany, Australia and New Zealand
 2017 DAC Beachcroft formed association with Lopez Saavedra & Villarroel Abogados, Argentina
 2017 DAC Beachcroft formed collaboration with Oldham, Li & Nie, Hong Kong
 2019 DAC Beachcroft opened a Northern Ireland office by acquiring McKinty and Wright
 2019 DAC Beachcroft opened office in Paris, forming DAC Beachcroft France

Main practice areas

Main practice areas are:
construction,
financial services,
health (independent sector and public sector),
industrials & manufacturing,
insurance,
public sector,
real estate,
retail and leisure,
technology, and
telecoms.

It is on the Crown Commercial Service panel for general legal advice services.

International associations
DAC Beachcroft is a founding member of Legalign Global, an alliance of four multi-national insurance-focused law firms: BLD Bach Langheid Dallmayr (Germany), Wilson Elser (US) and Wotton + Kearney (Australia and New Zealand).

External links
DAC Beachcroft LLP
DACB LinkedIn
DACB Twitter

References

Law firms of the United Kingdom
Companies based in the City of London
2011 establishments in the United Kingdom
Law firms established in 2011